Pterotaenia fasciata is a species of ulidiid or picture-winged fly in the genus Pterotaenia of the family Ulidiidae.

Distribution
Bolivia, Uruguay, Argentina, Chile.

References

Ulidiidae
Diptera of South America
Fauna of Bolivia
Fauna of Chile
Fauna of Uruguay
Fauna of Argentina
Taxa named by Christian Rudolph Wilhelm Wiedemann
Insects described in 1830